Battle: Freestyle is a 2022 Norwegian film directed by Ingvild Søderlind, written by Martina Cecelia and Maja Lundeand and starring Lisa Teige, Fabian Svegaard and Ellen Dorrit Petersen.

Cast 
 Lisa Teige as Amalie
 Fabian Svegaard Tapia as Mikael
 Ellen Dorrit Petersen as Vivian
 Bao Andre Nguyen as Moa
 Georgia May Anta as Alex
 Morad Aziman as Josef
 Keiona as Fabienne
 Léa Djyl as Maxine
 Lea Lavabre as Ella
 Adeline Tayoro as MC
 Ola G. Furuseth as Hans Christian
 Christine Grace Szarko as Gabrielle
 Philou

References

External links
 
 

2022 films
Norwegian-language Netflix original films
2020s dance films